The River Cwmnantcol  (Afon Cwmnantcol in Welsh) is a river in North Wales.

It flows north-west from its source and joins the Afon Artro at Pentre Gwynfryn.

References

External links 
www.geograph.co.uk : photos of the Afon Cwmnantcol and surrounding area

Cwmnantcol
Cwmnantcol